Tarkowo Dolne  is a village in the administrative district of Gmina Nowa Wieś Wielka, within Bydgoszcz County, Kuyavian-Pomeranian Voivodeship, in north-central Poland.

In the pre-partition period, Tarkowo was a noble village. The village was mentioned in the advisory register from the area of Kujawy from 1489. In the 16th century Tarkowo belonged to the Roman Catholic parish in Pęchów. The village was owned by the szlachta Sośnickich, and from 1764, the property belonged to Kraszewscy. In 1583, the village had six fields of arable land. In the 18th century as part of the Olęder colonization supported, among others by starosts and mayors of Bydgoszcz on the outskirts of the Bydgoszcz Forest - the village of Tarkowskie Olędry appeared. This initiated the division of the village into the upper part - a noble located on the moraine and lower plateau - an Olęder located in the valley with peat soil and extensive meadows. In Tarków Gorne, Catholics definitely prevailed, in Lower - Evangelicals. The census of the Bydgoszcz region from 1833 states that in the village of Tarkowskie Holendry (German: Tarkower Haulander), 115 people (all Evangelicals) lived in 18 houses. The village belonged to the Evangelical parish in Łabiszyn. Another census from 1860 states that there were 152 people in Tarkow Olędrach (129 evangelicals, 23 Catholics) in 17 houses. The nearest elementary school was in Nowa Wioska (Evangelical) and Lisewo (Catholic). The geographical dictionary of the Kingdom of Poland for 1884 states that Tarkowskie Olędry (German: Tarkowo Hauland, then Kol. Tannhofen) was a village located in the district of Inowrocław. 206 people lived here (190 Protestants, 16 Catholics) in 23 houses. The village had an area of 224 ha, of which 112 ha is cultivated land and 99 ha of meadows. The nearest post office and railway was in Nowa Wieś Wielka. The village belonged to the Catholic parish in Pęchów and the Evangelical parish in Nowa Wieś Wielka. During the Great Poland Uprising (1919), Polish insurgent troops were stationed in Tarków Dolny, Krążków, Pałczyna and Dąbrówka Kujawska. Attempts to approach Bydgoszcz were unsuccessful, despite temporary successes, including mastering of Nowa Wieś Wielka and Brzoza. In January 1920, under the Treaty of Versailles, the town was within the borders of the reborn Poland. The village was still in the district of Inowrocław. In 1934, as a result of administrative reform, it was included in the Złotniki Kujawskie rural commune. There was a four-grade elementary school with a German language of instruction in the village. In 1937, the school in Złotniki Kujawskie became a collective school, and a dozen or so students from Tarków began to attend this school from the fourth grade. After the war, the murdered Poles from the villages of Dziemionna, Jakubowo, Januszkowo, Krążkowo, Prądocin and Tarkowo were buried after the exhumation at the cemetery in Lisewo Kościelny, where in 1965 a monument was erected for them. In the years 1945-1954, Tarkowo (including Górne and Dolne) was a rural cluster. being part of the Złotniki Kujawskie commune. In 1947, in discussions about the new administrative division, the village's representatives were in favor of leaving them within the territorial boundaries of the Złotniki Kujawskie commune, which was motivated by economic and transport connections. After the administrative reform of September 25, 1954, the town was divided into two parts between the district of Bydgoszcz and Inowrocław. Attached to the cluster Nowawieś The Great part of Tarków appears from 1954 under the name Tarkowo Dolne. On May 13, 1955, the Presidium of the District National Council in Nowa Wieś Wielka asked the Presidium of the Poviat National Council in Bydgoszcz for the final delimitation of the boundaries between the villages of Tarkowo Dolne and Tarkowo Górne [4]. In 1946, there was a one-grade public school in the village. Until 1961, it was a full school, implementing a program of 7 classes, after which the institution was liquidated, and children from the village were sent to the school circuit in Nowa Wieś Wielka. In 1955, a common room was opened in Tarków Dolny, and from 1964, members of the Union of Rural Youth ran a library point in the village. In the years 1958-1961 the village was electrified. In 1964 a bus line Tarkowo Dolne - Brzoza (24 km) was opened. A year later a club café was opened in the village. In 2001-2002, the water supply system was supplied to Tarków Dolny.

References

Tarkowo Dolne